Lars Evert Patrik Hedner (born 27 May 1967 in Linköping) is a retired Swedish athlete who competed in sprinting events. He represented his country at the 1996 Summer Olympics, as well as three outdoor and one indoor World Championships.

Competition record

Personal bests
Outdoor
100 metres – 10.34 (Gothenburg 1994)
200 metres – 20.61 (Sollentuna 1995)
Indoor
60 metres – 6.65 (Malmö 1995)

References

1967 births
Living people
Sportspeople from Linköping
Swedish male sprinters
Olympic athletes of Sweden
Athletes (track and field) at the 1996 Summer Olympics
World Athletics Championships athletes for Sweden
20th-century Swedish people